Joseph Culp (born January 9, 1963) is an American actor and director. He is the son of actor Robert Culp and his second wife Nancy Ashe. He received his acting training at HB Studio in New York City.

Early life
Joseph Culp was born on January 9, 1963, and is the son of Robert Culp and his second wife Nancy Ashe.

Career
Joseph Culp appeared in a recurring role as Archie Whitman, the depression-era father of Jon Hamm's character Don Draper in the AMC series Mad Men. He was the first actor ever to play Doctor Doom in the first film version of Marvel Comics' The Fantastic Four. He also narrated the film September 11-The New Pearl Harbor by Massimo Mazzucco.

Culp also featured in the neo-noir detective video game L.A. Noire as Walter Robbins in the homicide case "The Studio Secretary Murder".

Personal life
He co-founded the Walking-In-Your-Shoes technique with Joseph Cogswell, a body-mind approach. In 1992, he and Cogswell founded the Walking Theatre Group based in Los Angeles.

He is the uncle of American rapper Bones.

Filmography

Film

Television

Video games

References

External links
 Official Joseph Culp website
 Walking in Your Shoes: Walking is Understanding by Christian Assel (Author), Joseph Culp (Foreword)
 Walking Theater Group
 Walking-In-Your-Shoes™

1963 births
Living people
20th-century American male actors
21st-century American male actors
Male actors from Los Angeles
American male film actors
American male television actors
Film directors from California